Narayan Manandhar (born 3 October 1981) is a Nepalese former footballer who is last known to have played as a defender for Three Star.

Career

On 29 September 2003, after a 0-16 loss to South Korea, Manandhar defected to South Korea.

References

External links

 

Nepalese footballers
Living people
Association football defenders
Nepal international footballers
1981 births
Three Star Club players